Safruddin Mawi (born 13 June 1964) is an Indonesian archer. He competed in the men's individual and team events at the 1988 Summer Olympics.

References

1964 births
Living people
Indonesian male archers
Olympic archers of Indonesia
Archers at the 1988 Summer Olympics
Place of birth missing (living people)
21st-century Indonesian people